Violet Mary Geraldine Cripps, Baroness Parmoor (née Nelson; 1891–1983), was a British peeress.

Early life
Lady Parmoor was the youngest daughter of Sir William Nelson, 1st Baronet and Margaret Hope.

Marriages and children
Lady Parmoor was married three times.

Firstly, she married George Rowley on 20 April 1914. They had one child:
 Michael Richard Bernard Rowley (born c 1915, died 19 September 1952), married Lady Sibell Lygon (born 10 October 1907, died 31 October 2005), daughter of William Lygon, 7th Earl Beauchamp.

Secondly, following a divorce earlier in 1920, on 26 November 1920 she married as his second wife Hugh Grosvenor, 2nd Duke of Westminster. They had no children and were divorced in 1926.

Thirdly, she married Lt Cdr Frederick Heyworth Cripps, 3rd Baron Parmoor (born 4 July 1885, died 5 October 1977) on 8 October 1927.  They had one son:
 Frederick Alfred Milo Cripps, 4th Baron Parmoor (born 18 June 1929, died 12 August 2008)

Lady Parmoor divorced her third husband in 1951 and died in 1983.

1891 births
1983 deaths
Violet
Parmoor
Daughters of baronets
Wives of knights